Memories...Do Not Open is the debut studio album by American electronic music duo the Chainsmokers, released on April 7, 2017, by Disruptor Records and Columbia Records. Its release was preceded by the singles "Paris" and "Something Just Like This" (in collaboration with Coldplay), both of which reached the top 10 in several national charts. Upon its release, the album received generally mixed reviews from music critics. The album debuted at number one on the US Billboard 200 with 221,000 album-equivalent units, of which 166,000 were pure album sales.

Background 

Chris Martin of Coldplay had first tweeted about the album, prompting the Chainsmokers to confirm it. It was revealed during an on-screen Grammy red carpet interview with the duo that their album title was to be named Memories...Do Not Open and it would be released on April 7, just before they embarked on the tour of the same name. As seen in the interview, Taggart was hesitant after revealing the release date of the album, before asking Pall if he should say it. Taggart said "We're ready. We've got a full album; it's going to be amazing. It's coming out April 7, was I supposed to say that?" before Pall responded "No, but it's alright".

Singles 
The lead single, "Paris", was released on January 13, 2017. The lead single peaked at number 6 on the Billboard Hot 100. The song went on to receive multiple certifications.

The second single, "Something Just Like This", which is a collaboration with British alternative rock band Coldplay, was released on February 22, 2017, along with the pre-order of the album. The single peaked at number 3 on the Billboard Hot 100 chart. During the week of March 18, 2017, "Something Just Like This", "Paris", along with "Closer", were simultaneously within the top 10 of the Billboard Hot 100, making the Chainsmokers the third group to have three simultaneous top 10 hits.

The third single, "Honest", was sent to top 40 radio on July 11, 2017. The single peaked at number 77 on the Billboard Hot 100.

Promotional singles 
A promotional single, titled "The One", was released on March 27, 2017, and reached number 78 on the Billboard Hot 100.

Another promotional single, a remixed version of "Young" by Midnight Kids, was released on September 29, 2017.

Critical reception 

At Metacritic, which assigns a normalized rating out of 100 to reviews from critics, the album received an average score of 43, based on eight reviews, indicating "mixed or average reviews". 

Damien Morris of The Observer gave a two-out-of-five star review, describing the group's music as, "instantly memorable yet completely forgettable", comparing the album to US President Donald Trump, "shallow, always betraying its influences, with a third-grade vocabulary and ambition that runs no further than emptying the nearest wallet." In Entertainment Weekly, Barry Walters highlighted the duo's commercial success, describing their style as, "smoothed-out, mid-tempo, nearly easy-listening formula", but opined it sounds, "as if you're playing the radio instead of one solitary album". He considered "Break Up Every Night" as the only dance cut, while "the other cuts are basically ballads with beats — modernized Moby without the soul-searching or gospel samples."

Sal Cinquemani from Slant Magazine gave the album two stars out of five, criticizing Taggart's lack of personality and vocal ability. Additionally, Cinquemani stated, "the downside to the wild success of that approach is that Taggart and Pall have been forced to discover their creative voices in front of the whole world. And unfortunately, the sound they've settled on is parked firmly in the middle of the road." On AllMusic, Neil Yeung also gave a two-out-of-five star review, calling Memories...Do Not Open a, "calculated dose of millennial escapism that peddles the same sounds as their far more engaging EP work." Maeve McDermott of USA Today questioned, "is this the worst album of 2017?", calling Taggart's vocals "hilariously bad". Philip Sherburne of Pitchfork claimed that, "The debut album from the celebrity production duo is a somber departure from their EDM days—a lifeless, anodyne pop record that wallows in basic feelings of regret and narcissism." Along with comparing the album to 2014 single "#SELFIE", Sherburne wrote, "None of it sounds anything like '#SELFIE,' but its worldview is barely any bigger than that song's narrow perspective". 

Jon Caramanica from The New York Times called the album a "savvy success that cannily toys with expectations" with its songs veering from the "usual gut punch" approach for its drops, but felt that the record is a "meaningless concept" in the "big-festival dance music" where the duo thrived in. He also commented on Taggart's "capable but unexciting" vocal performance and his "shockingly" few lyrical ideas, with most of the album's songs "[moaning] about brittle young relationships". Jordan Sargent of Spin observed the monotony of the record, stating: "The Chainsmokers have one song, and if you don’t want to hear 12 versions of it, please do not un-click the latch holding this box closed." He noted Taggart's "unique" vocal accessibility for listeners, but felt that his charm dissipated as the album wears on which resulted in a "series of songs that bleed endlessly into each other".

On Metacritic, Memories...Do Not Open stands as the lowest ranked album of 2017.

Commercial performance 
Memories...Do Not Open debuted at number one on the Billboard 200 with 221,000 album-equivalent units, of which 166,000 were pure album sales. As of August 25, 2017, the album has moved 1,000,000 album-equivalent units in the United States.

Track listing 

  signifies additional producer
  signifies co-producer
  signifies vocal producer

Personnel 
Credits are adapted from Memories...Do Not Open CD liner notes.

The Chainsmokers
Andrew Taggart
Alex Pall

Additional musicians

Emily Warren – vocals , background vocals 
Sean Scanlon – additional vocals 
Jordan Young – background/additional vocals 
Phoebe Ryan – background vocals 
Kane Parfitt – piano, keyboards 
Philip Plested – guitar 
Matthew Holmes – sampling and programming 
Philip Leigh – sampling and programming 
Chris Martin – vocals , piano 
Guy Berryman – bass guitar 
Jonny Buckland – lead guitar 
Will Champion – drums , backing vocals , programming 
Louane – vocals 
Harry Roberts – background vocals 
Jhené Aiko – vocals 
Jeremy Most – guitars 
Jonathan Perkins – string arrangement 
Brian Kelley – vocals 
Tyler Hubbard – vocals 

Design and managerial

James Zwaldo – photography, creative direction
Olivia Smith – package design
Adam Alpert – management

Production

The Chainsmokers – producers  
Adam Alpert – executive producer
Alex Pall – executive producer
Captain Cuts – co-production 
KIN – co-production 
Mac & Phil – co-production 
Jordan "DJ Swivel" Young – additional production , vocal production, mixing, recording 
Chris Gehringer – mastering
Emily Lazar – mastering 
Chris Allgood – mastering assistant 
Nicole "Coco" Llorens – recording assistant 
Martin Gray – recording assistant 
Desi Aguilar – recording assistant 
Rik Simpson – recording (band tracks) 
Owen Butcher – recording assistant (band tracks) 
Daniel Green – recording (additional band tracks) 
Tony Smith – recording assistant (additional band tracks) 
Bill Rahko – recording (vocals and piano) 
Aleks Von Korff – recording assistant (vocals and piano) 
Adam Catania – recording 
Matthew Holmes – recording 
Philip Leigh – recording 
Emily Warren – recording 
Alex Pall – recording 
Brian Warfield – recording 
Joey Moi – vocal production 
Eivind Nordland – vocal editing

Charts

Weekly charts

Year-end charts

Certifications

See also 
List of Billboard 200 number-one albums of 2017
List of Billboard number-one electronic albums of 2017
List of number-one albums of 2017 (Canada)

References 

2017 debut albums
Albums produced by DJ Swivel
The Chainsmokers albums
Columbia Records albums
Albums produced by Mac & Phil